The Nanpin school (南蘋派 Nanpin-ha) was a school of painting which flourished in Nagasaki during the Edo period.

Etymology 
The school takes its name from Nanpin, the art name of Chinese painter Shen Quan (1682–1760), an artist who painted in the Ming academic style.

History 
Shen Quan arrived in Nagasaki on the 37th ship on December 3, 1731, and left Japan two years later, on September 18, 1733. He specialised in bird-and-flower painting  (Ch: huaniao hua, J: kachōga), one of the major artistic subjects, especially among professional Chinese painters.

The commercial activity in the port of Nagasaki facilitated the spread of Western knowledge in Japan. Japanese people were also particularly interested in ancient Chinese culture. Paintings of the Nanpin school show flora and fauna that are not just "realistic", but styled as they appear in Chinese and European treatises. 

In the 18th century, Japanese people became very interested in Western natural sciences, even if that did not mean a break from Chinese tradition.
Chinese and Western treatises on natural sciences could have played a key role in the spread of knowledge on subjects such as botany, zoology, and mineralogy, and that the images featured in these treatises might have inspired artists to choose and create new representations of bird-and-flower. That is why scholar Meccarelli has called the style of the Nanpin school "flora and fauna decorative painting'.
In the Nanping painting school, the decorative aspect was even more emphasised, because paintings had to satisfy the taste of merchants.

Notable artists 
 Kumashiro Yūhi (1712–1772)
 Zheng Pei (fl. mid-18th century)
 Sō Shiseki (1715–1786)

See also 
 Nanga (Japanese painting)

References

 
Nanga